William Lynn Ogg (May 17, 1937 – September 10, 2020) was a member of the Ohio House of Representatives from 1995 to 2002. He also served on the Scioto County Commission and on the Portsmouth City Council. His district consisted of Scioto County, Ohio. He was succeeded in 2003 by Todd Book.

His son, William K. Ogg, is the Scioto County treasurer and both are members of the Scioto County Democratic Party Hall of Fame.

References

Democratic Party members of the Ohio House of Representatives
County commissioners in Ohio
Ohio city council members
1938 births
2020 deaths
People from Portsmouth, Ohio
21st-century American politicians